As of  , IndiGo flies to a total of 102 destinations including 76 domestic destination within India and 26 international destinations within the extended neighbourhood in Asia.
The list includes the city, country and the airport's name, with the airline's hubs marked.


List

See also
 Air India Express destinations
 Alliance Air destinations
 List of Vistara destinations
 List of SpiceJet destinations
 List of Go First destinations

References

Lists of airline destinations